Anaesthesia is a monthly peer-reviewed medical journal covering research in anaesthesia, including intensive care, peri-operative medicine, critical care medicine and pain therapy. It is the official journal of the Association of Anaesthetists.

According to the Journal Citation Reports, the journal's 2020 impact factor is 6.955, ranking it fifth out of 33 journals in the category "Anesthesiology".

References

External links 
 

Publications established in 1946
Wiley-Blackwell academic journals
Monthly journals
English-language journals
Anaesthesia